The Gold Sword for Bravery was a Russian award for bravery. It was set up with two grades on 27 July 1720 by Peter the Great, reclassified as a public order in 1807 and abolished in 1917. From 1913 to 1917 it was renamed the Saint George Sword (Георгиевское оружие) and considered one of the grades of the Order of St. George.

Gallery

Select recipients

References 

Ceremonial weapons
1720 establishments in Russia
Awards established in 1720
1917 disestablishments in Russia
Honorary weapons
Recipients of the Gold Sword for Bravery
Orders, decorations, and medals of the Russian Empire
Modern European swords